Look Tin Eli (1870–1919) (Chinese: 陸潤卿, Lù Rùnqīng; also Luk Tin-Sun, Look Tin Sing) was a Chinese-American businessman, born in Mendocino, California, who achieved much success in San Francisco's Chinatown, especially after the 1906 earthquake.

Mendocino beginnings

Born May 5, 1870, in the back of the store operated by his father on the south side of Mendocino's Main Street, Look Tin Eli was the firstborn in Mendocino's Look family (陸 Lù, also Luk or Loke in Cantonese).  The Look family was headed by his Chinese immigrant father from Heung-san (香山), Luk Bing-Tai (aka Eli Tia Key), and his mother, Su Wang, who had four children.

As a boy, he was sent to China in 1879, prior to the 1882 Chinese Exclusion Act, to learn the Chinese language and culture. Upon his return to San Francisco in 1884, he was denied entry at age 14 back to the United States because he lacked the necessary certificate under the 1882 Act. He challenged the decision at the federal level and won his case at the U.S. Circuit Court of San Francisco.

This was the celebrated case of Look Tin Sing, which was Look Tin Eli's childhood name.  In court, he was represented by two lawyers: Thomas Riordan, a prominent San Francisco attorney retained by the Chinese consulate and perhaps the Chinese Six Companies, and William M. Stewart, a prominent railroad attorney and former attorney general of California.  The 1884 ruling by Justice Stephen Field, who declared that children born in U.S. jurisdictions are U.S. citizens regardless of ancestry, was an important decision that preceded and later cited at the landmark 1898 U.S. Supreme Court citizenship case.

  

After completing his education, he took over the management of what was his father's store, which had been sold in 1881.  Reportedly, he and his younger brother, Lee Eli, "capably ran the Mendocino store in the 1890s".  As a merchant, he visited China twice, returning to the U.S. in July 1891 and November 1895.

San Francisco career

In the 1890s, Look Tin Eli, with his China-born wife (surname Jeong) and one child, moved to San Francisco.

In February 1904, Tin Eli, with his younger brother, Lee Eli, as his assistant, helped establish a San Francisco branch of the Russo-Chinese Bank at 417 Montgomery Street, the only branch in the United States.  He was the "confidential adviser to the bank" and managed the Chinese negotiations and loans, abroad and locally.

After the 1906 San Francisco earthquake and fire destroyed Chinatown, including the Russo-Chinese Bank, Look Tin Eli became "the public face of the post-quake rebuilding of Chinatown".  As general manager of the Sing Chong bazaar, he articulated a vision of post-quake Chinatown as an "ideal Oriental City".  Already a skilled negotiator, he secured substantial loans from his Hong Kong and Canton partners for the rebuilding and persuaded Chinese merchants to hire western architects to rebuild Chinatown in an "Oriental" style in order to promote tourism and social change.  In this way, his grand vision of "veritable fairy palaces filled with the choicest treasures of the Orient" was realized by the design (by T. Paterson Ross) and construction of the pagoda-topped buildings of the Sing Chong and Sing Fat bazaars on the west corners of Grant Ave (then Dupont St) and California St, which have since become icons of San Francisco Chinatown.

In 1907, Tin Eli also helped found and operate, in partnership with cannery magnate Lew Hing, the Canton Bank of San Francisco (金山廣東銀行), the first Chinese-owned bank in the United States.  On the corner of Kearny and Clay, it was for a time the only bank to provide the Chinese community with financial resources to rebuild Chinatown.  A year later, Canton Bank of San Francisco was the principal bank for more than 100,000 Chinese in the United States and Mexico.  The largest individual stockholder was Mendocino's Look Poong-San, who is his brother, also known in the U.S. as Lee Eli, who became a wealthy banker in China.  

According to the San Francisco Chronicle, Look Tin Eli was able in 1908 to persuade the chief of police to allow fireworks permit for Chinese New Year festivities, gaining support from the white merchants as well.   The reconstruction of the post-quake Chinatown was thus completed in 1908, a year ahead of the rest of the City of San Francisco.

In October 1914, as president of the Canton Bank, he hosted 300 guests in a grand "red egg feast", expanding the custom traditionally reserved for male babies, to celebrate the one-month birthday of his new granddaughter, with the governor of the Federal Reserve Bank among those bringing congratulations.

In 1915, in response to Pacific Mail Steamship Company withdrawing service to the Orient, a group of Chinese-American businessmen organized the China Mail Steamship Company (中國郵船公司), the first Chinese-owned steamship company in the United States, and elected Look Tin Eli as its founding president.

References

1919 deaths
American bankers
People from Mendocino, California
American people of Chinese descent
1870 births
19th-century American businesspeople
20th-century American businesspeople
Businesspeople from California